S-350 may refer to:

 Soviet submarine S-350
 Vityaz missile system (S-350E)